Vera Fischer (27 January 1925 – 14 July 2009) was a Croatian sculptor.

Fischer was born in Zagreb to a Jewish family on 27 January 1925. Her father died when she was one year old and she was raised by her grandparents, and mother Latica (née Klein). In 1951, Fischer graduated from the Academy of Fine Arts, at the University of Zagreb under professor Vanja Raduš. She has participated in the numerous solo and group exhibitions at home and abroad, such as the first public appearance in 1952 at the 8th Croatian Association of Artists exhibition, and in 1962 solo exhibition at the Croatian Association of Artists salon in Zagreb. In 2002, Fischer organized an autobiographical exhibition. Since 1952, Fischer was a member of the Croatian Association of Artists. In 1997, President of Croatia Franjo Tuđman awarded Fischer with the Order of Danica Hrvatska face of Marko Marulić. She was an active member of the Jewish community in Zagreb. Fischer died in Zagreb on 14 July 2009 and was buried at the Mirogoj Cemetery.

References

Bibliography

 

1925 births
2009 deaths
Artists from Zagreb
Croatian Jews
Croatian artists
Jewish sculptors
Academy of Fine Arts, University of Zagreb alumni
Burials at Mirogoj Cemetery
Croatian women sculptors
20th-century Croatian sculptors
20th-century women artists